Layton Williams (born 13 September 1994) is an English actor, singer, and dancer, best known for playing the role of Stephen Carmichael in the television series Bad Education. His first job was at the age of twelve playing the title role in Billy Elliot the Musical on London's West End. During his childhood he also played Young Michael Jackson in Thriller – Live musical, Kylie in the BBC series Beautiful People and featured in the CBBC Documentary School for Stars, which documented life at the acting school Italia Conti. From late 2016, he began playing Angel in the 20th anniversary tour of Rent around the UK. The production, particularly his performance, received rave reviews. Since January 2019 he is playing the title character of Jamie New in Everybody's Talking About Jamie and is currently taking the role on tour around the UK.

Early life, acting background and education
Williams was born in Bury, England to a white mother and a father of Jamaican descent. After several months of training at the Billy Elliot Academy in Leeds, Williams debuted in Billy Elliot the Musical on 26 February 2007 in London's West End. His training was documented on The Paul O'Grady Show  in which he appeared in on 25 May 2007 and then in several morning TV shows, TV interviews, and short clips related to the musical. He is the second non-white boy, the other being Matthew Koon, and the first mixed race youth to star in the show. He gave his finale performance in the musical on 29 November 2008; Williams is still the second-longest running performer as 'Billy' in the show's history. On 31 January 2009, 2 months after his final performance, Layton appeared on the programme Feelgood Factor on ITV, where he and two other 'Billy' actors, Tanner Pflueger and Tom Holland, performed a specially choreographed version of Angry Dance from Billy Elliot the Musical.

Williams has studied street dance and drama at Carol Godby's Theatre workshop in Bury, Greater Manchester. He also studied ballet at Centre Pointe, Manchester. Williams was awarded a scholarship to Sylvia Young Theatre School in Marylebone, London and stayed there until 2008. He attended Broad Oak High School in Bury, his home town, but once his natural talent for the performing arts became clear he began to attend the Italia Conti Academy of Theatre Arts. During his time at the Italia Conti Academy of Theatre Arts Williams was featured in a children's documentary 'School for Stars' which was broadcast on the children's television channel CBBC.

Acting career
He was offered the part as Young Michael Jackson in the West End musical Thriller – Live where he did a few performances before he outgrew the role. Williams became well known to a TV audience as the character Kylie – acting, dancing and singing in the 2008-2009 BBC Two comedy Beautiful People, series 1 and 2. From 2012 to 2014, he played Stephen Carmichael in the BBC comedy Bad Education and also appeared in the 2015 spinoff film. Williams returned to the show for the 2022 reunion special and became the co-lead of the show's fourth series alongside Charlie Wernham.

Williams went on tour with Matthew Bourne's show The Car Man. Following that he performed the part of Duane in Hairspray the Musical 2015–2016 tour. He announced that he would also be in the new 20th anniversary cast of Rent which toured the UK from October 2016. Layton landed the lead role in the hit musical Everybody's Talking About Jamie in the Apollo Theatre in London's West End, where he would play the role of Jamie for 11 months. In August 2019, it was announced Williams would be joining the tour cast of the musical, which was postponed due to the coronavirus pandemic, but has now resumed.The production has now been taken to Los Angeles, California, where Williams will lead the cast of Everybody’s Talking About Jamie in the show’s US debut.

Williams is a strong supporter of the charities Stonewall and Ditch the Label. He is the director of 'Pros From The Shows', which holds dance, singing and acting workshops across the UK. Pros From The Shows has also released a successful clothing line.

Personal life
Williams is gay and has spoken about coming to terms with his sexuality while working on Billy Elliot in London. He has several siblings and half siblings who are not in the public eye. His family are from Manchester though he moved away to London when he was 11 to pursue his acting career. He attended the Italia Conti Academy of Theatre Arts in London. His paternal grandparents are from Jamaica, but his father was born in the UK.

Acting credits

Film and television

Theatre

Workshops

See also
 List of British actors

References

External links

1994 births
Living people
Alumni of the Sylvia Young Theatre School
Black British male actors
English male child actors
English male musical theatre actors
English male stage actors
English male television actors
English people of Jamaican descent
English people of Montserratian descent
English gay actors
LGBT Black British people
People from Bury, Greater Manchester
British LGBT singers